Monsignor Kelly Catholic High School  is a private, parochial High School located in Beaumont, Texas. It is a member of the Roman Catholic Diocese of Beaumont.  A majority of students at Kelly come from various grade schools within the Diocese of Beaumont and one Episcopalian elementary and middle school. Other students come from public schools throughout Southeast Texas.

Student organizations

Spirit organizations
Kelly Dance Force
Varsity and Junior Varsity Cheerleading
K-9 Krew
Marching Band (consists of both the Symphonic and Jazz bands)
Code Blue Crew

Service organizations
Key Club
Anchor Club
Yellow Ribbon
Retreat Team
Student AmbassadorsGreen Team

Student government
Student Council

Academic Organizations
National Honor Society
Mu Alpha Theta, Math Honor Society
Academic Challenge Team

Other student organizations
Art Club
Symphonic and Jazz Bands
Choir
Debate Team
Mock Trial Team
Drama ClubZephyr'' (school literary magazine)
Spanish Club
Latin Club
Journalism
Yearbook
Chess Club
Christmas Club
Key Club
STEM Club
Robotics
Mock Trial

Notable alumni

Joe Deshotel, attorney, politician, and businessman
Adam Henry, football coach and former player
Vamsi Mootha, physician-scientist and computational biologist
Mark Petkovsek, former Major League Baseball pitcher
Dade Phelan, real estate developer and politician
Ford Proctor, Major League Baseball player.
Kheeston Randall, former American football defensive tackle

References

External links
 School website
 Roman Catholic Diocese of Beaumont

Catholic secondary schools in Texas
Educational institutions established in 1895
Education in Beaumont, Texas
High schools in Jefferson County, Texas
Roman Catholic Ecclesiastical Province of Galveston–Houston
1895 establishments in Texas